The Vickers F.B.5 (Fighting Biplane 5) (known as the "Gunbus") was a British two-seat pusher military biplane of the First World War. Armed with a single .303 in (7.7 mm) Lewis gun operated by the observer in the front of the nacelle, it was the first aircraft purpose-built for air-to-air combat to see service, making it the world's first operational fighter aircraft.

Design and development
Vickers began experimenting with the concept of an armed warplane designed to destroy other aircraft in 1912. The first resulting aircraft was the "Destroyer" (later designated Vickers E.F.B.1) which was shown at the Olympia Aero Show in February 1913, but crashed on its maiden flight. This aircraft was of the "Farman" pusher layout, to avoid the problem of firing through a tractor propeller, and was armed with a single belt-fed Vickers gun.

Vickers continued to pursue the development of armed pusher biplanes, and their Chief Designer Archie Low drew up a new design, the Vickers Type 18, or Vickers E.F.B.2. This was a two-bay biplane powered by a single 80 hp (60 kW) Gnome Monosoupape nine-cylinder rotary engine; the aircraft had a steel tube structure, with fabric-covered wings and tail, and a duralumin-covered nacelle with large celluloid windows in the sides. The unequal-span wings were unstaggered, with lateral control by wing warping, while the aircraft had a large semi-circular tailplane. Armament remained a single Vickers gun mounted in the nose of the nacelle, with limited movement possible, and a very poor view for the gunner. The E.F.B.2 made its first flight at Brooklands on 26 November 1913. It was soon followed by the E.F.B.3, powered by a similar engine, but using ailerons instead of wing warping, and with equal-span wings, while the nacelle omitted the large windows fitted to the E.F.B.2.

The belt-fed machine gun proved problematic, and the weapon was changed to the lighter, handier, drum-fed .303 in (7.7 mm) Lewis gun.

The F.B.5 first flew on 17 July 1914. It was powered by a single 100 hp (75 kW) Gnome Monosoupape nine-cylinder rotary engine driving a two-bladed propeller, and was of simple, clean, and conventional design compared with its predecessors. In total, 224 F.B.5s were produced, 119 in Britain by Vickers, 99 in France and six in Denmark.

F.B.6
The Vickers F.B.6 was a development of the F.B.5 with an increased span on the upper wing. Only one was built.

F.B.9 
A further development of the F.B.5, the Vickers F.B.9, had a more streamlined nacelle and an improved ring mounting (either Vickers or Scarff) for the Lewis gun. Fifty were delivered to Royal Flying Corps training units. A few served in some F.E.2b squadrons while they were waiting for their new aircraft between late 1915 and early 1916.

Operational history
The first F.B.5 was delivered to No. 6 Squadron of the Royal Flying Corps (RFC) at Netheravon in November 1914. On 25 December the first use of the F.B.5 in action took place, when F.B.5 No. 664 took off from Joyce Green airfield to engage a German Taube monoplane, hitting the Taube (and possibly causing its loss) with incendiary bullets from a carbine after the Lewis gun jammed. Eighteen days later, the same flight crew, Second Lieutenants M. R. Chidson and D. C. W. Sanders, flying the first F.B.5 in France, No. 1621, were forced to land behind German lines, and the new plane fell into enemy hands.

The F.B.5 began to be seen on the Western Front when the first reached No.2 Squadron RFC on 5 February 1915. The type served in ones and twos with several other units before No. 11 Squadron RFC became the world's first fighter squadron when, fully equipped with the F.B.5, it deployed to Villers-Bretonneux, France on 25 July 1915. Second Lieutenant G.S.M. Insall of 11 Squadron won the Victoria Cross for an action on 7 November 1915 in which he destroyed a German aircraft while flying a Gunbus. No. 18 Squadron RFC, which deployed to France in November 1915, also operated the F.B.5 exclusively.

Early aircraft were fitted with British-built Monosoupapes, which proved less reliable than French-built engines, while much work was done before a useful gun mounting became available. Although its forward-firing machine gun was a great advantage, the fighter did not have the speed or rate of climb to pursue its quarry; thus, the F.B.5's performance proved to be inadequate for its intended role. This can be illustrated by noting that only the single pilot/observer team of Lionel Rees and James McKinley Hargreaves became aces while flying this type.

By the end of 1915, the aircraft was outclassed by the Fokker Eindecker. Examples of the improved Vickers F.B.9 were sent to France, pending sufficient supplies of the Royal Aircraft Factory F.E.2b, but the active career of the Gunbus was soon over. The remaining examples were mostly used as trainers.

Legacy
The Vickers company persisted with an active experimental program during the First World War period, including a line of single-seat pusher fighters that culminated in the Vickers F.B.26 Vampire of 1917–18, but the F.B.5 remained their only significant production aircraft until the Vickers Vimy bomber, which entered service too late to affect the war.

Despite its moderate effectiveness, the Vickers F.B.5 did have a lasting legacy as German pilots continued to refer to British pusher aircraft as "Vickers-types". Many victories over D.H.2 or F.E.2b pushers were reported as destruction of a "Vickers".

A flying replica of the F.B.5 Gunbus was completed in 1966 and flew until late 1968. It is now (2014) an exhibit at the Royal Air Force Museum at Hendon near London.

Variants
E.F.B.2 (Vickers Type 18)
Single-engined two-seat fighter prototype powered by 100 hp (75 kW) Gnome Monosoupape rotary engine. It had a slight overhang on upper wings and wing warping controls. Its nacelle was fitted with large celluloid windows and was armed with a single Vickers machine gun. One built.
E.F.B.3 (Vickers Type 18B)
Revised fighter, with equal-span wings, aileron controls and revised nacelle without windows. One built.
E.F.B.4
Proposed design of similar layout to "Destroyer" - unbuilt.
E.F.B.5
Further improved development of E.F.B.3.  Six built for RFC and RNAS.
F.B.5
Production version of E.F.B.5 with rectangular tail surfaces. At least 120 built by Vickers, with 75 built by Darracq in France and 12 by the Tøjhusvoerkstedt (Danish Arsenal Workshops), giving a total of at least 207.
F.B.6
Pre-production aircraft, differing from E.F.B.5 by having revised unequal span wings with large overhang and ailerons only on upper wing. One built.
F.B.9
Improved derivative of F.B.5, with revised wings and tail, more streamlined nacelle, a new V-type undercarriage and using streamlined Rafwire bracing instead of conventional cable bracing. 95 built by Vickers and 24 by Darracq, giving 119 in total.
F.B.10
Proposed development with 100 hp (75 kW) Isotta Fraschini engine. Unbuilt.
S.B.1
1914 design for dual control trainer based on E.F.B.3 and powered by 100 hp (75 kW) Anzani radial engine. Unbuilt.

Operators

Royal Danish Air Force

Royal Flying Corps
No. 2 Squadron RFC
No. 5 Squadron RFC
No. 7 Squadron RFC
No. 11 Squadron RFC
No. 16 Squadron RFC
No. 18 Squadron RFC
No. 24 Squadron RFC
No. 25 Squadron RFC
No. 32 Squadron RFC
No. 35 Squadron RFC
No. 41 Squadron RFC

Specifications (Vickers F.B.5)

See also

References

Notes

Bibliography
Andrews, C. F. and Morgan, E. B. Vickers Aircraft since 1908. London: Putnam, 1988. .
Bruce, J. M. The Aeroplanes of the Royal Flying Corps (Military Wing). London: Putnam, 1982. .
Bruce, J. M. "The Vickers Fighting Biplanes". Air International, September 1994, Vol 47 No 3. pp. 166–171.

Bruce, J. M. "Vickers' First Fighters". Air Enthusiast No. 12, April - July 1980. pp. 54–70. .
Gutmann, Jon and Dempsey, Harry. Pusher Aces of World War 1. Osprey Publishing, 2009. , .
Mason, Francis K. The British Fighter since 1912. Annapolis, Maryland: Naval Institute Press, 1992. .
"The Olympia Exhibition". Flight, 22 February 1913, pp. 210–230.

External links

British Aircraft Directory: Vickers F.B.5, archived on Internet Archive
"Vickers Golden Jubilee" - pictures of EFB 1, 2, 3, 4 and 5, FB5 and FB6

Vickers F.B.05
Single-engined pusher aircraft
F.B.05
Military aircraft of World War I
Rotary-engined aircraft
Aircraft first flown in 1914